Sly Spy, known in Japan as  and known in Europe as Sly Spy: Secret Agent, is an arcade game developed and published by Data East in 1989. After Data East became defunct due to their bankruptcy back in 2003, G-Mode bought the intellectual rights to the arcade game as well as most other Data East games and licenses globally.

Description

Plot
The plot resembles some movies and novels of the James Bond series and takes place in the U.S. in an unspecified time period described in game as "199X". During the introduction sequence, the president and his wife are waving at the crowd next to a limousine at the White House in Washington D.C., when terrorists (some flying in using jetpacks) approach the president and his wife armed and dangerous, and, as soon as the screen goes red and gun sounds are heard, they seem to shoot not only the crowd, but also the president and the first lady, who are both presumed dead.

Later, a secret agent working for the American secret service, and known only by the name of Sly, is informed that the terrorists who struck at the presidential ceremony were located, identified, and confirmed to be CWD (Council for World Domination) members. CWD is a secret underground criminal organization with terrorist foundations, involved in drugs and arms dealing and government corruption, and ultimately plotting world conquest. Sly is assigned by the secret service to eliminate the CWD.

Listening to the world's desperate plea for freedom and hoping to protect those he loves most, Sly jumps from a plane towards Washington D.C., and begins his campaign to prevent the terrorists from infiltrating not only the city, but several spots in the U.S., and must also prevent a nuclear missile from launching and striking the Earth.

The final challenge
In the course of the game, the player faces off  against several bosses, eventually encountering the leader of CWD, whose identity is never given outside of that title. A spiked ceiling slowly descends from above and the boss is protected by a force field. Sly must shoot or kick it to deal enough damage and dent the field. Sly then shoots CWD's leader, finishing him for good before fleeing the base with hardly a scratch.

In the beginning of the ending sequence, Sly receives a final transmission from the president himself, who somehow escaped the attack at the early moments of the game and is miraculously alive. The president congratulates Sly for saving the planet, but then tells him that he "missed a couple of things and may come back to pick them up". Sly goes to the White House, only to arrive at the entrance and quickly find roaring applause from the crowd as well as what seems the president's daughters – who were enchanted with Sly's heroic deeds – posing and smiling alongside him for a photo, who gave him several kisses, as a "thank you".

Then, he and his girls return home in a Ferrari F40, speeding all the way, going together to enjoy their well-deserved honeymoon. As the car drives off the screen, "THE END" is shown.

Gameplay

Players control the secret agent name Sly Spy through eight different stages. Some stages have their own gameplay. In the first part of the first stage, players shoot enemies horizontally while sky-diving. The second half of the first, third, fifth, sixth and eighth stages are played in a run and gun format similar to Namco's Rolling Thunder and its sequels, but it lacks the ability to jump between the top and bottom floors while grabbing rails. Also, when out of ammo or attacked by a boss with one hit, Sly Spy drops his firearm while the game becomes a beat'em up in 2D platform manner, much like Shinobi. Players can make Sly Spy do three different kicks: high kicks, low kicks and jump kicks. The second stage shows Sly Spy riding on his motorcycle with a built-in machine gun, which makes this stage a combination of run-and-gun and vehicular combat game formats, much like Moon Patrol. The fourth and seventh stages are in marine-based, side-scrolling shooter format. Minor enemies will drop several different items when defeated, such as extra ammo, cans of Coca-Cola-esque soda and machine guns. Sometimes, enemies will drop a jetpack on land or a DPV while underwater to make transportation easier.

James Bond references
Enemies also drop parts of the ultimate weapon in the game called the Golden Gun, which is based on the weapon of the same name from the novel/film titled The Man with the Golden Gun; however, instead of shooting Golden Bullets like in the James Bond series, Sly Spys version functions nearly the same way as the Cobra Gun in Data East's 1988 RoboCop arcade game and the Heavy Barrel energy cannon from the arcade game of the same name. It is also shaped like a rifle instead of a pistol; when the Golden Gun is equipped along with either the motorcycle or a DPV, their built-in firearms will shoot the same energy bolts shot from the Golden Gun itself.

Besides the protagonist and the Golden Gun being references of the James Bond series, several bosses and stages in the game are based on villains and settings in the James Bond series. The second boss is based on Jaws from the films The Spy Who Loved Me and Moonraker, the third boss is based on Oddjob from the film Goldfinger, and the ninth and final stage is based on the launch base seen in Moonraker.

Ports
The game was ported to several home systems. Ocean Software ported it to the Amiga (with completely different background music composed by Tim Follin), Amstrad CPC, Commodore 64, Atari ST and ZX Spectrum in 1990 exclusively in Europe, while Data East released Ocean's Commodore 64 version in North America in 1990.

Reception 
In Japan, Game Machine listed Sly Spy on their August 15, 1989 issue as being the fifth most-successful table arcade unit of the month.

Legacy
Several references from Data East's other arcade games made cameo appearances in Sly Spy. A poster showing Chelnov (a.k.a. Atomic Runner) can be seen at the beginning of Stage 3, the logo for the aforementioned Bad Dudes can be seen at the end of Stage 3, and a poster showing Karnov can be seen at the beginning of Stage 5. In the 1990 movie RoboCop 2, officer Duffy gets pushed by RoboCop into a Bad Dudes arcade cabinet, but with Sly Spy built into it. Along with a few other Data East arcade games, they appeared in the film due to licensing and advertising agreements between Orion Pictures, Data East and Ocean Software after the release of two video games based on the RoboCop property.

In 2010, G-Mode and G1M2 added the arcade game to Data East Arcade Classics as Secret Agent.

In 2018, it was released on Nintendo Switch.

In 2021, it was released as part of Data East Arcade 1 on the Evercade.

References

External links
Official G-Mode webpage of Sly Spy
 
 Sly Spy at arcade-history

1989 video games
Amiga games
Amstrad CPC games
Arcade video games
Atari ST games
Run and gun games
Vehicular combat games
Commodore 64 games
Data East video games
Multiplayer video games
ZX Spectrum games
Spy video games
Video games developed in Japan
Nintendo Switch games
Data East arcade games